Nancy Snow may refer to:

 Nancy Snow (philosopher), professor of philosophy
 Nancy Snow (academic), American professor and scholar of propaganda and public diplomacy